is a song by Japanese singer songwriter Mai Kuraki, taken from her fourth studio album If I Believe (2003). It was released on March 5, 2003 by Giza Studio. The song was written by Kuraki herself and Aika Ohno, while the production was done by Cybersound. It was served as the theme song to the 2003 Japanese animation movie, Detective Conan: Crossroad in the Ancient Capital.

The writer of "Time After Time (Hana Mau Machi de)", Aika Ohno, covered the song on her cover third studio album Silent Passage.

Track listing

Charts

Weekly charts

Monthly charts

Year-end charts

Certifications

References

2003 singles
2003 songs
Mai Kuraki songs
Songs written by Aika Ohno
Songs written by Mai Kuraki
Giza Studio singles
Japanese film songs
Songs written for animated films
Songs about cities
Song recordings produced by Daiko Nagato